Fábio André Costa Pais (born 28 May 1996) is a Portuguese footballer who plays for Vidago as a defender.

Early life 
On May 28, 1996, Pais was born as Fábio André Costa Paia in Covilhã, Portugal.

Football career
On 25 February 2015, Pais made his professional debut with Sporting Covilhã in a 2014–15 Segunda Liga match against Vitória Guimarães B.

References

External links

Stats and profile at LPFP 

Fábio Pais at ZeroZero

1996 births
People from Covilhã
Living people
Portuguese footballers
Association football defenders
S.C. Covilhã players
Liga Portugal 2 players
G.D. Tourizense players
Sport Benfica e Castelo Branco players
C.D.C. Montalegre players
GD Bragança players
Sportspeople from Castelo Branco District